Lichenostigma cosmopolites is a species of lichenicolous fungus belonging to the family Phaeococcomycetaceae. It was described as new to science in 1999 by lichenologists Josef Hafellner and Vicent Calatayud. The fungus grows parasitically on Xanthoparmelia lichens. In India it has been reported from the thallus of Xanthoparmelia stenophylla.

It has cosmopolitan distribution.

References

Arthoniomycetes
Fungi described in 1999
Fungi of India
Taxa named by Josef Hafellner